Dm3 may stand for:
Cubic decimetre, a volume unit which is exactly equivalent to a litre
SJ Dm3 locomotives pulling iron ore trains in Sweden and Norway
File type for a map in Quake, a first-person shooter computer game
Dm3 density meter density measurement system for industrial in-line slurries
DM3,  an Australian Garage Rock band
.dm3 Digital Micrograph file
Despicable Me 3, a 2017 film
BDGP R5 (dm3), an assembly of the Drosophila melanogaster genome